Satoblephara is a genus of moths in the family Geometridae.

Species
Satoblephara faircloughi Holloway, 1994
Satoblephara hollowayi (Sato, 1990)
Satoblephara karsholti (Sato, 1990)
Satoblephara luzonensis (Sato, 1990)
Satoblephara nepalensis (Sato, 1993)
Satoblephara owadai (Inoue, 1978)
Satoblephara parvalaria (Leech, 1891)

References
Natural History Museum Lepidoptera genus database

Boarmiini